Sept-Îles Airport  is situated  east of the town of Sept-Îles, Quebec, Canada.

The airport is classified as an airport of entry by Nav Canada and is staffed by the Canada Border Services Agency (CBSA) on a call-out basis from the Quebec City Jean Lesage International Airport. CBSA officers at this airport can handle general aviation aircraft only, with no more than fifteen passengers.

Airlines and destinations

See also
Sept-Îles/Lac Rapides Water Aerodrome

References

External links

Certified airports in Côte-Nord
Transport in Sept-Îles, Quebec